The 1961 U.S. National Championships (now known as the US Open) was a tennis tournament that took place on the outdoor grass courts at the West Side Tennis Club, Forest Hills in New York City, United States. The tournament ran from September 1 until September 10, 1961. It was the 81st staging of the U.S. National Championships, and the fourth Grand Slam tennis event of 1961.

Finals

Men's singles

 Roy Emerson defeated  Rod Laver  7–5, 6–3, 6–2

Women's singles

 Darlene Hard defeated  Ann Haydon  6–3, 6–4

Men's doubles
 Chuck McKinley /  Dennis Ralston   defeated  Rafael Osuna /  Antonio Palafox 6–3, 6–4, 2–6, 13–11

Women's doubles
 Darlene Hard /  Lesley Turner defeated  Edda Buding /  Yola Ramírez 6–4, 5–7, 6–0

Mixed doubles
 Margaret Smith /  Bob Mark defeated  Darlene Hard /  Dennis Ralston default

Notes

References

External links
Official US Open website

 
U.S. National Championships
U.S. National Championships (tennis) by year
U.S. National Championships
U.S. National Championships